The Virginia Commonwealth University (VCU) Center for Rehabilitation Science and Engineering (CERSE) is a comprehensive, interdisciplinary, University-approved Center of Excellence furthering the science and serving the needs of persons with disabilities. CERSE is administrated and coordinated by the Department of Physical Medicine and Rehabilitation, funded through the VCU Office of Research, the School of Medicine, the Department of Physical Medicine and Rehabilitation (PM&R), and the Virginia Department of Rehabilitative Services (DRS). CERSE serves as the mechanism for coordination, consolidation, and support of evidence based disability research endeavors from multiple schools and departments at VCU and a number of affiliate organizations. In partnership with the clinical services provided through the VCU Medical Center, the Hunter Holmes McGuire VA Medical Center (VAMC), Sheltering Arms Rehabilitation Programs, VCU Children’s Hospital of Richmond, the U.S. Navy, the U.S. Marine Corps and other affiliated programs, CERSE has brought together researchers, clinicians, rehabilitation specialists, therapists, and academicians from the numerous backgrounds and specialties. These collaborations optimize resources, avoid duplication of effort, and increase the capacity to successfully compete for high-level grant and foundation funding. CERSE is currently composed of seven Research Cores built on the strength of existing disability research and training:
 Neurorehabilitation
 Musculoskeletal and Pain Rehabilitation
 Employment and Economic Outcomes
 Defense and Veterans Rehabilitation
 Pediatric Rehabilitation
 Rehabilitation Engineering and Technology
 Health Disparities

Scholars from each of these areas are actively engaged in numerous on-going research efforts. Additionally, CERSE has developed an integrated research development service to support rehabilitation research with a variety of supports and activities. CERSE has numerous on-going training and knowledge translation efforts, and an emerging development and fundraising effort.

Organization and governance
CERSE is currently housed an operated within the VCU Department of Physical Medicine and Rehabilitation. Substantive funding for CERSE comes from both this department, the Dean’s Office of the School of Medicine and the Office of the Vice President for Research. The Dean of the School of Medicine, Peter Buckley serves as the senior university administrator for CERSE. He is responsible for space, budget appropriations, and management for CERSE. As a VCU Board of Visitors approved center, CERSE also comes under the purview of the Vice President for Research, Francis L. Macrina, who is responsible for budget appropriations, guidance, and oversight of CERSE. The interim executive director, Paul Wehman is the primary administrative officer of CERSE. He is responsible for the overall direction and activities of CERSE, is the final authority on day to day activities, and is ex officio chair of the CERSE Administrative Leadership Team.

Administrative leadership team
The CERSE Administrative Leadership Team acts as an advisory board to the center, providing the Executive Director with suggestions and feedback on day to day operations. The Administrative Leadership Team also provides a springboard for long term planning. In an effort to represent the university-wide orientation of CERSE, the Administrative Leadership Team consists both of CERSE principals as well as faculty from both campuses. Current members of the team are:

Paul Wehman, Ph.D. – Interim Executive Director
Edmund O. Acevedo, Ph.D., Professor and Chair, Department of Health and Human Performance, Director of CERSE Muskuloskeletal and Pain Rehabilitation Core
Jeffrey Kreutzer, Ph.D., Professor, Department of Physical Medicine & Rehabilitation, Director of CERSE Neurorehabilitation Core
Brian McMahon, Ph.D., Associate Dean, Research for the School of Allied Health Professions, Professor, Department of Rehabilitation Counseling
Paul Wetzel, Ph.D., Professor, Department of Biomedical Engineering

References

Education in Richmond, Virginia
School of Medicine